Hyperolius chlorosteus is a species of frog in the family Hyperoliidae. It is found in Ivory Coast, Guinea, Liberia, and Sierra Leone. Its natural habitats are subtropical or tropical moist lowland forests and rivers. It is threatened by habitat loss, but remains a Least-concern species.

References

chlorosteus
Amphibians described in 1915
Taxonomy articles created by Polbot